Wawa, Inc. is an American chain of convenience stores and gas stations located along the East Coast of the United States, operating in Pennsylvania, New Jersey, Delaware, Maryland, Virginia, Washington, D.C., and Florida. The company's corporate headquarters is located in the Wawa area of Chester Heights, Pennsylvania in Greater Philadelphia. , Wawa was the largest convenience store chain in Greater Philadelphia, and it is also the third-largest retailer of food in Greater Philadelphia, after Acme Markets and ShopRite.

History

The Wawa business began in 1803 as an iron foundry. In 1890, George Wood, an entrepreneur from New Jersey, moved to Delaware County, Pennsylvania; it was here that he began the Wawa Dairy Farm. Wood imported cows from the British Crown dependency island of Guernsey, and bought  of land in the Chester Heights area; the corporate headquarters would later be renamed Wawa. Since pasteurization was not yet available, many children faced sickness from consuming raw milk. Wood arranged for doctors to certify his milk was sanitary and safe for consumption, which convinced many consumers to buy the product. The strategy worked, and allowed the Wawa dairy to grow. Demand for dairy products grew rapidly during the 1920s, and so did the company. Wawa began using the slogan "Buy Health by the Bottle"; they served customers in Pennsylvania and New Jersey, delivering milk to customers' homes.

In the 1960s, however, many consumers began buying milk in stores instead of using home delivery. Wawa started to open its own stores to adjust to these market changes. On April 16, 1964, Grahame Wood, George Wood's grandson, opened the first Wawa Food Market at 1212 MacDade Boulevard in Folsom, Pennsylvania, which remained in operation until June 17, 2016, when it closed in favor of a new "Super Wawa" down the street. A parade was held from the original location to the new store on opening day.

The Wawa Food Market stores were also part of a then-new trend in retailing, the convenience store. Open both earlier and later than traditional supermarkets, they carried other foods and beverages besides milk, as well as other items from the Wawa dairy.

In 1977, Wawa began sharing ownership of the company with its associates through profit-sharing plans. In 1992, Wawa formalized its associate ownership with its Employee Stock Ownership Plan (ESOP), with stock being awarded to associates annually based on the prior year's service. Because the company is privately held, Wawa secures an independent assessment of its stock value at regular intervals to ensure that the ESOP is fairly maintained.  Today, the ESOP accounts for more than 40% of Wawa stock.

Company

Name and logo
The chain's name comes from the site of the company's first milk plant and corporate headquarters in the Wawa, Pennsylvania area. The name of the town Wawa is in turn derived from the Ojibwe word wewe (pronounced "way-way") meaning snow goose, despite the company's image of a Canada goose. (Longfellow uses the word in  Book II ("The Four Winds") of The Song of Hiawatha, writing "He it was who [...] sent the wild-goose, Wawa, northward") Although the writing is not specific on species, an image of a Canada goose in flight serves as the Wawa corporate logo.

Leadership
The current CEO of Wawa is Chris Gheysens, who succeeded Howard Stoeckel in January 2013. Eleuthère (Thère) du Pont has served as both the CFO and president, but is no longer associated with the company. Richard "Dick" Wood Jr. is chairman of the board of directors. Many Wood family members are active in the company. Although Wawa is a family-run business, Wawa associates own roughly 50% of the company, more than 40% of which is owned through the company's employee stock-ownership program.

Holdings and locations

In 2015, Wawa ranked 34th on the Forbes magazine list of the largest private companies, with total revenues of $9.68 billion. , Wawa employs over 22,000 people in 720+ stores (450+ offering gasoline). , Wawa's New Jersey stores were concentrated mostly in South Jersey.

The properties are located in Chester Heights and Middletown Township. Wawa Inc. owns  of land around "Red Roof," the corporate headquarters,  of land around the Wawa dairy, and the  J.T. Farms. The Wood family owns  of estate property. Cynthia Mayer of the Philadelphia Inquirer said that, as a result of the land holdings, the Wood family was "the closest thing to a feudal barony this side of du Pont."

Beginning in the 1940s, the dairy facility began selling excess parcels of land. In 1964, it sold about 40 acres to the Franklin Mint. Several years prior to 1989, the dairy sold 25 acres of land to a retirement complex, Granite Farms Estates. The process of selling excess land continued sporadically.

Wawa Inc. owns the 225-acre J.T. Farms, a separate farm property.  Wawa Inc. leases it to Bill Faul, who maintained a herd of 100 Holstein cattle and paid $1,500 (currently $2778.12) per month. Wawa continued to own the farm due to symbolic reasons. It also kept heifers along Route 1 in a strip of land adjacent to the plant which did not produce milk; Fritz Schroeder, then-vice president of Wawa Inc., said in 1989, "[w]e like them for the ambiance."

Corporate headquarters

The company's corporate headquarters is located in the Wawa area, along Baltimore Pike in Chester Heights. The headquarters is in proximity to Middletown Township.  about 300 employees work in the headquarters. The Borough of Chester Heights receives a majority of its local services tax from employees of Wawa.

Programs and promotions
Wawa provides surcharge-free ATMs, the result of a partnership with PNC Bank that began in 1985. Wawa implemented the program in stores in 1996. In 2010, Wawa surpassed 1 billion transactions under the PNC brand.

In the late 1980s and through the 1990s, Wawa engaged in a scholarship sponsorship program that involved Irish students (mainly from UCC in Cork, Ireland) running some stores on the Pennsylvania Main Line, allowing the students to study for their MBAs from Saint Joseph's University in Philadelphia.

In 1994, Wawa opened a store in Center City, Philadelphia, which sold food only.

In 1994, Wawa debuted the "Super Wawa", larger stores with public restrooms and more parking. Gasoline pumps were added in 1996. On October 21, 2010, Wawa began testing the sale of diesel fuel at 12 of its New Jersey locations due to an increasing number of cars using this fuel.

In the 2000s, Wawa was among the first stores to implement self-serve computer touch-screen menus for food orders, in an attempt to improve order accuracy, speed and for upselling.

In 2003, Wawa and McLane Co. reached a 30-year agreement to construct a distribution center in Carney's Point, New Jersey, to handle the majority of Wawa's distribution. The center began operation in May 2004.

In 2005, Wawa partnered with JPMorgan Chase to offer a Visa credit card branded with the Wawa name. It ceased issuing new cards in December 2007 and the program was canceled in November 2010. Wawa would later partner with Citi to restart the Wawa credit card program.

Wawa moved into social media to connect with its customers, and in 2006, its "I Love Wawa" MySpace page had over 5,000 members. By the middle of 2013, its Facebook page had reached nearly 1.1 million likes.

On June 30, 2010, 20 Wawa locations in Pennsylvania started a trial of selling Pennsylvania Lottery tickets from automated kiosks. On December 6, 2010, it announced that all 210 Pennsylvania Wawa locations would sell lottery tickets from kiosks by spring 2011.

On April 16, 2014, to celebrate its 50th anniversary, Wawa gave away free coffee and launched a nonprofit foundation to donate $50 million to health and hunger initiatives.

Products

Wawa offers products found at most convenience chain marts such as chips, drinks, and soda. Wawa also sells its own branded iced tea, orange juice, and milk. Wawa used to sell its own branded soda but it has been discontinued. Wawa has Coca-Cola Freestyle soda fountains.

Key products include its variety of coffee, latte, and cappuccino flavors and sizes, and made-to-order hoagies. Wawa also offers a brand of hot breakfast products, most famous of which is the "Sizzli", and also a full deli with touch-screen ordering of sandwiches, hot sides, drinks, and deli meats. Wawa sells alcohol in Florida, Virginia, and at select locations in Pennsylvania.

For a short time between 1994 and 1996, Wawa sold Pizza Hut personal pan pizzas and Taco Bell burritos.

In 2020, Wawa tested burgers, waffle fries, and chicken sandwiches at six locations. Later in the same year, Wawa begin testing a dinner menu at select locations. The dinner menu includes items such as burgers, fries, pasta, and rotisserie chicken.

Store locations

Wawa operates stores in Delaware, Florida, Maryland, New Jersey, Pennsylvania, Virginia, and Washington, D.C. Wawa's territory once stretched into Northern New Jersey, New York and Connecticut, but in the late 1990s, the decision was made to abandon the franchised stores in the New York metropolitan area and New England, as it was too competitive. The abandoned stores were re-branded when they were sold to Krauszer's (in Connecticut) and a variety of other convenience retailers, but most are still recognizable as they retain their distinctive "Wawa" design. The company continued to operate numerous stores in Central Jersey and South Jersey, and re-entered North Jersey in 2010, when Wawa opened a new store in Parsippany. Wawa opened its 100th Super Wawa in New Jersey on October 12, 2012, in Woodbridge. Wawa moved farther into North Jersey opening in Kearny on January 11, 2013, and Lodi on October 4, 2013. The company plans to open five Wawas a year in North Jersey for the next 10 to 12 years.

On July 18, 2012, Wawa entered the Florida market when it opened its first location in Orlando. It had expanded to more than 70 Florida locations by the end of 2015, with plans for 120 more by 2022.

, Wawa has over 900 locations across Delaware, Maryland, New Jersey, Pennsylvania, Virginia, Washington, D.C., and Florida.

In some Jersey Shore towns, Wawa designs its stores to match the aesthetic, and changes operating procedures to adapt to shore culture. In Cape May, Wawa has a Victorian-themed store. In Wildwood, there is a 1950s-themed store.

Wawa opened its largest location at the time in the Farragut Square area of Washington, D.C. on December 14, 2017. On December 14, 2018, Wawa opened a flagship location at 6th Street and Chestnut Street in Center City, Philadelphia.

On December 18, 2020, Wawa opened its first drive-thru at a convenience store/gas station location in Westampton, New Jersey. In September 2020, Wawa began construction on its first drive-thru only location in Falls Township, Bucks County, Pennsylvania; this location opened on January 8, 2021.

In 2022, Wawa announced their intentions to expand to North Carolina by 2024. It has yet to be announced exactly where in the state the first Wawa will be. The company also announced plans to open stores in the Florida Panhandle (including Panama City, Pensacola, and Tallahassee) and Mobile, Alabama in 2024. Wawa has plans to expand into the Nashville area in Tennessee, with the first location to open in 2025 and plans for up to 40 stores. In 2022, Wawa announced an aggressive push into South Central Pennsylvania and specifically Harrisburg, which has long been Sheetz territory but also has Rutter's and Turkey Hill as strong local competitors alongside national competitors such as 7-Eleven/Speedway. In October 2022, Wawa announced it would be expanding into Georgia by 2024. On December 7, 2022, Wawa announced an expansion into Kentucky, Indiana, and Ohio after 2025.

Competitors
Wawa, for the most part, covers parts of Pennsylvania not already served by rival stores such as Sheetz, which Wawa is often compared to due to their similar business models and Pennsylvania roots. This led to a "rivalry" between the two chains among Pennsylvanians, though the two companies themselves have a friendly relationship. The character of the two chains has been described as, "Sheetz is typically louder and flashier, with a more intense vibe than Wawa's unassuming, plain and simple appearance. ... But while Sheetz may seem like it has more options, Wawa reminds us that no matter how you are dressed, you are welcome there." Despite the rivalry, the two stores generally do not compete head-to-head in Pennsylvania, with only a few small overlapping areas in the eastern part of the state served by both chains. In Virginia, both chains share a market in the Hampton Roads, Richmond, and Northern Virginia regions. Wawa's planned expansion into South Central Pennsylvania as well as North Carolina will see more head-to-head competition from both chains, enough where Sheetz subsequently announced more store locations in Western Pennsylvania (where GetGo, 7-Eleven/Speedway, and locally based Coen Markets are major competitors as well a Circle K to a lesser extent) to fend off a potential expansion of Wawa into the Pittsburgh market.

Data breach
On December 20, 2019, Wawa's CEO Chris Gheysens announced that the company had found malicious software on its payment processing servers that affected every location across the country, according to the statement. The malware is believed to have been on the servers since as early as March 4, 2019, and contained on December 12, 2019. It affected approximately 34 million cards.

On December 27, 2019, The Philadelphia Inquirer reported that at least six lawsuits seeking class-action status had been filed against the company in federal court in Philadelphia.

On July 26, 2022, Pennsylvania Attorney General Josh Shapiro announced an $8 million agreement with Wawa to resolve the data breach.

Popularity
Wawa enjoys a level of popularity in the region likened to a cult following. This has been attributed to its focus on service and by its fostering a sense of community, described as, "Somehow, whether because of the goofy name or the iconic Canada goose soaring in the sunset, Wawa succeeded in creating an atmosphere that intimately connects with a broad sense of community." Wawa CEO Chris Gheysens has attributed this to a slow-growth strategy, comparing Wawa's cult popularity with that of stores with similar strategies, such as In-N-Out Burger.

Controversies

Wawa's expansion efforts have sometimes met with controversy from local communities. In Coral Gables, Florida, land which was planned to be used for affordable housing was instead approved as a new site for a Wawa gas station.

References

Further reading

External links

 
 Interview with Howard about his Career

Convenience stores of the United States
Cuisine of the Mid-Atlantic states
Economy of the Eastern United States
Fast-food chains of the United States
Companies based in Delaware County, Pennsylvania
Gas stations in the United States
American companies established in 1964
Privately held companies based in Pennsylvania
1964 establishments in Pennsylvania
Retail companies established in 1964
Employee-owned companies of the United States